is a railway station on the Iida Line in the city of Iida,  Nagano Prefecture, Japan, operated by Central Japan Railway Company (JR Central).

Lines
Kiriishi Station is served by the Iida Line and is 127.7 kilometers from the starting point of the line at Toyohashi Station.

Station layout
The station consists of a single ground-level side platform serving one bi-directional track. There is no station building, but only a platform built on top of the platform.

Adjacent stations

History
Kiriishi Station opened on 17 December 1926 a  temporary stop. It was elevated to a full station on 1 August 1943. With the privatization of Japanese National Railways (JNR) on 1 April 1987, the station came under the control of JR Central.

Passenger statistics
In fiscal 2016, the station was used by an average of 123 passengers daily (boarding passengers only).

Surrounding area

See also
 List of railway stations in Japan

References

External links

 Kiriishi Station information 

Railway stations in Nagano Prefecture
Railway stations in Japan opened in 1943
Stations of Central Japan Railway Company
Iida Line
Iida, Nagano